James I. Say (1862 – June 23, 1894) was an American professional baseball player who played in the early days of Major League Baseball. He was born in Baltimore, Maryland and died there at the age of 31 or 32. He was the brother of Lou Say.

External links

Major League Baseball infielders
Baseball players from Maryland
Louisville Eclipse players
Philadelphia Athletics (AA) players
Wilmington Quicksteps players
Kansas City Cowboys (UA) players
Cleveland Blues (1887–88) players
1862 births
1894 deaths
19th-century baseball players
Harrisburg (minor league baseball) players
Wilmington Quicksteps (minor league) players
Omaha Omahogs players
Keokuk Hawkeyes players
Elmira Colonels players
Utica Pent Ups players
Jersey City Jerseys players
Scranton Miners players
Hartford (minor league baseball) players
Wilmington Blue Hens players